Erkkilän silta (the ″Erkkilä Bridge″) is a bridge located in the center of Tampere, Finland. It crosses the railway yard to the north of the Tampere Central Station, connecting the Jussinkylä and Tammela districts. The bridge is a type of steel tied-arch bridge, a combination of arch and beam bridge with a span of 42 meters. The stone ground supports of the bridge come from a bridge built in 1963 on the same site. The bridge was completed in 1983.

In connection with the construction of the bridge, another old ground support was reinforced with drill piles. The bridge was renovated in 2005 by, among other things, renewing the waterproofing and coating of the bridge deck and painting the steel arches.

References

External links 

An aerial panorama of the Erkkilä Bridge (in Finnish)

Bridges completed in 1983
Bridges in Finland
Buildings and structures in Tampere
Tied arch bridges
Transport in Tampere